Whi5 is a transcriptional regulator in the budding yeast cell cycle, notably in the G1 phase. It is an inhibitor of SBF, which is involved in the transcription of G1-specific genes. Cln3 promotes the disassociation of Whi5 from SBF, and its disassociation results in the transcription of genes needed to enter S phase.

Roles in cell cycle progression 
Start of the checkpoints in the cell cycle,  which allows the cell to enter S phase from late G1, and has an all-or-nothing response to stimulus from the cell. The checkpoint allows the cell to either enter G0 or G1 phase and cell conditions must be sufficient to enter the cell cycle; for example, if the cell is starving, or if there is nutrient depletion, then it will halt progression in the cell cycle. However, if the start checkpoint is satisfied then the cell can begin DNA replication and the cell will halt growing. In the cascade of events that leads to the transcription of G1-specific genes, Whi5 is involved in the regulation of transcription.

According to David Morgan, SCB-binding factor (SBF) and MCB-binding factor (MBF) are transcription factors that bind to SCBs and MCBs respectively. SCBs and MCBs are in promoter regions upstream of key genes expressing G1-specific proteins, which signal the transition from G1 to S phase. The transcription factors are heterodimers, which contain a DNA-binding unit (Swi4 and Mbp1) and a regulatory sub-unit (Swi6). SCBs contain Swi4 and Swi6, while MCBs contain Mbp1 and Swi6. Therefore, activation of SBF and MBF will result in the transcription of G1-specific genes.

Interactions with SBF 
In a study done by Robertus de Bruin et al. (2004), researchers found that Whi5 is an important regulatory protein that binds to SBF. Therefore, G1-specific SCB-controlled genes are regulated upstream by Whi5, suppressing their transcription. It is a stably-bound protein that binds to promoters via SBF in early G1 phase and, before transcriptional activation is cued, Whi5 dissociates from SBF. Thus, its activity supports the biological definition of Whi5 being an inhibitor of SBF-controlled genes. Additionally, another study by Michael Costanzo et al. (2004) explains that SBF is needed to recruit Whi5 to the G1/S promoter because their interaction is stable.

Whi5 regulation 
According to David Morgan, Cln3/Cdk1, a cyclin-CDK complex unit, promotes the dissociation of Whi5 from SBF through inhibitory hyperphosphorylation. Additionally, according to de Bruin, Cdc28 CDK, is believed to be involved in the phosphorylation of Whi5. Cdc28 is activated by Cln 1, Cln2, and Cln 3, and is an important part of cell cycle progression. Once activated, the association of Whi5 and its eventual dissociation from SBF results in activation of the transition to S phase. It is phosphorylated in many positions in G1, like the metazoan Retinoblastoma protein (Rb), but only certain phosphor-residues correlate with the transition from G1 to S phase. Additionally, de Bruin explains that Whi5 phosphorylation determines the timing of SBF-dependent transcriptional activation and cell cycle progression. For example, in a cln3Δ and whi5Δ mutant, cells will enter S phase sooner, because the absence of whi5 bypasses the need for Cln3 activation. Therefore, in a cln3Δ and whi5Δ cell, the timing of cell cycle progression is not regulated by inhibitory phosphorylation by Cln3/Cdk1 and other cyclins, which results in smaller cell size. Thus, Cln3/Cdk1 is important for the dissociation of Whi5 and the timing of when it should dissociate. Whi5 alone cannot determine the correct timing for cell cycle events, but it does affect the onset to begin the transition.

According to Costanzo et al. (2004), Whi5 is believed to change its localization depending on CDK phosphorylation of Whi5. Like transcription factors, it will localize to either the nucleus or outside of the nucleus. When CDK is active and it associates with Whi5, then Whi5 will dissociate from SBF, and it will exit the nucleus. However, when CDK is not present or active, then Whi5 will localize back into the nucleus. Whi5 is in the nucleus in late mitosis and G1 phase. Once the mitotic exit network is activated and CDK activity is reduced, Whi5 enters the nucleus. And, when Cln3 activates CDK, then it will cause the dissociation of Whi5 and its concomitant exit from the nucleus.

Whi5 and Cln3 dilution 
A study done by Kurt Schmoller et al. (2015) shows that with increasing concentration of Cln3, there is also increasing cell size. Therefore, the total concentration of Cln3 is constant until pre-Start G1 is reached. Additionally, in the same respect, Whi5 amount does not increase or decrease, but with increasing cell size, total Whi5 concentration decreases. Thus, with Whi5 total concentration decreasing and Cln3 total concentration remaining constant, Whi5 dilution via cell growth results in the control of proliferation. Researchers found that in S/G2/M phases, Whi5 is synthesized in a size-dependent manner. When the daughter cell is born, the small cell has a high concentration of Whi5, which keeps the cell in pre-Start phase. As the cell size increases, the preliminary Whi5 amount will be diluted in the larger cytosol volume, and the constant Cln3 concentration will be greater than the concentration of the Whi5 inhibitor. Therefore, the concentration of Whi5 and Cln3 can explain why there are timing standards for when the cell will enter S phase. Thus, the Whi5 inhibitor and its coordination with Cln3 are critical proteins that control cell size.

SBF-controlled genes 
Once Whi5 is dissociated from SBF-controlled genes, it results in the transcription of major genes that allow the cell to enter S phase. These genes include G1/S and S cyclins, which are crucial for the onset of the next phase. According to Vishwanath Iyer et al. (2001), SBF-controlled genes are important for budding and for membrane and cell-wall biosynthesis. Therefore, Whi5 is an important regulator for eventual cell cycle events.

References

Transcription coregulators